Joni Adamson (born 1958) is an American literary and cultural theorist.  She is considered one of the main proponents of environmental justice and environmental literary criticism, or Ecocriticism. She is a professor of the environmental humanities (also known as the "ecological humanities") and senior sustainability scholar at Arizona State University in Arizona.  In 2012–13, she served as president of the Association for the Study of Literature and Environment (ASLE), the primary professional organization for environmental literary critics (over 1800 members in 41 countries around the world).  From 1999 to 2010, she founded and led the Environment and Culture Caucus of the American Studies Association (ASA-ECC).

Work 
American ecocritic Lawrence Buell concludes that Adamson's work in American Indian Literature, Environmental Justice and Ecocriticism and The Environmental Justice Reader: Politics, Poetics, and Pedagogy (University of Arizona Press, 2002) should be seen as a major critical intervention in early eco-criticism because it raised the “challenge of eco-justice revisionism” and catalyzed a "second wave" in the field that should "not be underestimated". These books documented the efforts of environmental justice groups around the world to organize, mobilize, and empower themselves to take charge of their own lives, communities, and environments. What sets The Environmental Justice Reader apart from other eco-critical field genealogies and collections, and lays the foundation for Adamson's recent co-edited collections, American Studies, Eco-criticism, and Citizenship and Eco-criticism and Indigenous Studies: Conversations from Earth to Cosmos, is an insistence that “theory” can be produced outside the academy in communities fighting for equitable distribution of social and environmental goods and bads.

Cited work
Adamson's work is widely cited in the fields of eco-criticism, environmental justice critical studies, and Native American and indigenous studies. Her publications focus on global Indigenous peoples and cultures, Southwestern American borderlands and Sonoran Desert studies, ranching and grasslands, food justice and the food sovereignty movement, and multi-species ethnography. In a 2015 story in The Guardian, Adamson's research on indigenous cultures and "how the past informs the present and the future" might be employed to "make desert cities into more sustainable ecosystems" was described as "groundbreaking" and "life-changing," and cited as an example of why humanities research should be better known.

Environmental humanities
Adamson has contributed to the environmental humanities by exploring emerging methodological approaches being described as "multispecies ethnography" and "indigenous cosmopolitics". Early publications, including Why Bears Are Good to Think (1992), began laying the groundwork for these approaches by focusing on "more-than-human" or "transformational" characters from Indigenous oral traditions that should be taken seriously as indigenous scientific literacies, rather than untrue “"myths".  Stories about these characters, Adamson argued, could be considered "theory" or "seeing instruments", in the sense that they allow modern peoples to "see" and theorize valid responses to an increasingly complex and chaotic modern world. Building on the work of symbolic anthropologists and cultural theorists such as Claude Levi-Strauss and Barbara Babcock, Adamson concludes that bears, bearwalkers and other figures from the oral tradition are "good to think" "not because they are ‘good to eat’ or ‘good to prohibit’ but because they are ‘good to think’" (Adamson 1992, 32–35; Adamson and Galeano 224-225).

Multispecies publications
Recent publications build on the work of Deborah Bird Rose and Donna Haraway to flesh out the notion of multispecies relationship as it is represented in literature and film. Adamson also explores how indigenous activists and communities reference "indigenous cosmovisions" in their "comopolitical" calls for rights for rivers, oceans, water, trees, seeds, and sacred plants. Her writing on these topics deepens understandings of the meanings of international indigenous-led and written documents such as the United Nations Declaration on the Rights of Indigenous Peoples (UNDRIP), Universal Declaration on the Rights of Mother Earth and Climate Change and revisions to Ecuador's constitution (Title VII) often referred to as the Bien Vivir or "Good Way of Living" chapter (Ecuadoran Constitution 2008). These documents call for extension of concepts of human rights to nonhuman species and advocate for the intergenerational space and time required for the survival of all species and the continuance of ecosystemic relationships that are critical to well-being at multiple scales, from the microscopic to the cosmic (Adamson 2014, 2012, Adamson and Monani 2016).

Caucus
From 1999 to 2010, she founded and led the Environment and Culture Caucus of the American Studies Association (ASA-ECC).

Publications 
Joni Adamson and Michael Davis, eds. Humanities for the Environment: Integrating Knowledge, Forging New Constellations of Practice. New York and London: Routledge, 2017.
Salma Monani and Joni Adamson, eds. Ecocriticism and Indigenous Studies: Conversations from Earth to Cosmos. New York and London: Routledge, 2016.
Joni Adamson, William A. Gleason and David N. Pellow, Keywords for Environmental Studies. New York and London: New York University Press, 2016.
Joni Adamson and Kimberly N. Ruffin, eds. American Studies, Ecocriticism, and Ecology: Thinking and Acting in the Local and Global Commons. New York and London: Routledge, 2013.
Joni Adamson, Rachel Stein, and Mei Mei Evans, eds. The Environmental Justice Reader: Politics, Poetics, and Pedagogy. Tucson: U of Arizona P, 2002.
Joni Adamson. American Indian Literature, Environmental Justice, and Ecocriticism: The Middle Place. Tucson: University of Arizona Press, 2001.

References 

Arizona State University faculty
American women academics
Living people
1958 births
21st-century American women